Desmia ctenuchalis is a moth in the family Crambidae. It was described by Paul Dognin in 1907. It is found in Peru.

References

Moths described in 1907
Desmia
Moths of South America